Ribagorza; or Ribagorça is a comarca (county) in Aragon, Spain, situated in the north-east of the province of Huesca. It borders the French département of the Haute-Garonne to the north and Catalonia (the comarques of Val d'Aran, Alta Ribagorça, Pallars Jussà, and Noguera) to the east. Within Aragon its neighboring counties are Sobrarbe, Somontano de Barbastro, and La Litera. It roughly corresponds to the Aragonese part of the medieval County of Ribagorza. The administrative capital of Ribagorza is Graus, although the historical capital of the county was at Benabarre.

The Ribagorçan dialect is a transitional Aragonese–Catalan dialect spoken in the western part of the county. Municipalities in the eastern part, bordering Catalonia, are part of La Franja, a geolinguistic area, where the local language is a variety of Catalan. However, Aragonese and Catalan form a dialect continuum here and the geographical limit of both languages cannot be drawn in a clear-cut manner.

Municipalities
The Catalan version of the names of the towns are in brackets.
Arén (Areny de Noguera)
Benabarre (Benavarri)
Benasque (Benasc)
Beranuy
Bisaurri (Bissaürri)
Bonansa
Campo
Capella
Castejón de Sos (Castilló de Sos)
Castigaleu
Chía (Gia)
Estopiñán del Castillo (Estopanyà)
Foradada del Toscar
Graus
Isábena (Isàvena)
Lascuarre (Lasquarri)
Laspaúles (Les Paüls)
Monesma y Cajigar (Monesma i Queixigar)
Montanuy (Montanui)
Perarrúa (Perarrua)
La Puebla de Castro (La Pobla del Castre)
Puente de Montañana (El Pont de Montanyana)
Sahún (Saünc)
Santaliestra y San Quílez (Santa Llestra i Sant Quilis)
Secastilla (Secastella)
Seira
Sesué (Sessué)
Sopeira
Tolva (Tolba)
Torre la Ribera (Tor-la-ribera)
Valle de Bardají (La Vall de Bardaixí)
Valle de Lierp  (La Vall de Lierp)
Viacamp y Litera (Viacamp i Lliterà)
Villanova (Vilanova d'Éssera)

References

External links 
 Ribagorza, Comarca's site

 
Comarcas of Aragon
Geography of the Province of Huesca
La Franja
Pyrenees